Trevor Langa (born 30 October 1989) is a Vanuatuan cricketer. He played in the 2013 ICC World Cricket League Division Six tournament.

In March 2018, he was named in Vanuatu's squad for the 2018 ICC World Cricket League Division Four tournament in Malaysia. In September 2019, he was named in Vanuatu's squad for the 2019 Malaysia Cricket World Cup Challenge League A tournament. In the same month he was named in Vanuatu's Twenty20 International (T20I) squad for their series against Malaysia. He made his T20I debut for Vanuatu, against Malaysia, on 4 October 2019.

References

External links
 

1989 births
Living people
Vanuatuan cricketers
Vanuatu Twenty20 International cricketers
Place of birth missing (living people)